Liverpool Institute High School for Girls, Blackburne Place, Liverpool, England, was a girls' grammar school that was established in 1844 and closed in 1984. It was situated off Hope St to the north-east of Liverpool Cathedral in the area close to the University of Liverpool and Catharine Street (A5039).

History
The school was made a Grade II listed building on 14 March 1975. It was based in Blackburne House that is now the Blackburne House Centre for Women.

By the 1970s it had around 350 girls, with 50 in the sixth form, being administered by the City of Liverpool Education Committee.

Closure
Once Liverpool City Council became Labour-controlled in 1983, having had no overall control from 1974–83, it quickly introduced comprehensive schools in all but one of its grammar schools.

Notable former pupils

 Edwina Currie, politician
 Lis Howell, TV executive
 Tina Malone, actress

See also
 Liverpool Institute for Boys

References

Defunct schools in Liverpool
Girls' schools in Merseyside
History of Liverpool
Grade II listed buildings in Liverpool
Educational institutions established in 1874
Defunct grammar schools in England
Grade II listed educational buildings
Educational institutions disestablished in 1984
1874 establishments in England
1984 disestablishments in England